The McDonald–Wait–Newton House is a historic house at 1406 Cantrell Road in Little Rock, Arkansas. U.S. Senator Alexander McDonald lived in the house and Robert Francis Catterson stayed at the house during his time as a U.S. Marshall.

It is a -story brick building, with a mansard roof providing a full third story.  The main facade is five bays wide, with a projecting central section topped by a mansarded tower.  The roof is pierced by dormers with segmented-arch tops, and windows framed by decorative hoods.  The main entrance is set in the base of the tower, with an elliptical stained glass light above.  A porch shelters the entrance and wraps around to the right side, with a modillioned cornice and bracketed posts.  Built in 1869, it is the last surviving post-Civil War mansion built along what became known as "Carpetbaggers' Row", as it is where a number of Northerners settled when moving to the city.

The house was listed on the National Register of Historic Places in 1978. The house today hosts the "1836 Club", a social club.

See also
National Register of Historic Places listings in Little Rock, Arkansas

References

Houses on the National Register of Historic Places in Arkansas
Second Empire architecture in Arkansas
Houses completed in 1869
Houses in Little Rock, Arkansas
National Register of Historic Places in Little Rock, Arkansas